Johannes Lukas "Hans" Bos (born 16 June 1950) is a Dutch biochemist and cancer researcher. He has been a professor of physiological chemistry at Utrecht University since 1991. He is also employed by the University Medical Center Utrecht.

Career
Bos was born in Vlaardingen on 16 June 1950. He studied biochemistry at the Vrije Universiteit Amsterdam between 1969 and 1975. In 1980 Bos obtained his title of Doctor at the University of Amsterdam under Piet Borst, with a thesis titled: "Structural analysis of yeast mitochondrial DNA. The region of the 21S ribosomal RNA gene". He then started working under Alex van der Eb at Leiden University. In 1984 Bos started research on Ras mutations. In 1986 Bos became a lector at Leiden University. In 1991 he was appointed professor of physiological chemistry at Utrecht University.

In 2013 the Dutch Cancer Society presented an international "Dream Team" on cancer research, the team was led by Bos and Hans Clevers. In 2015 Dutch newspaper de Volkskrant announced that Bos was the Dutch researcher who obtained most funds in the Netherlands during the previous ten years, obtaining over 31 million euro.

Honours and distinctions
Bos was elected a member of the European Molecular Biology Organization in 1996. He was elected a member of the Royal Netherlands Academy of Arts and Sciences in 2006. In 2014 Bos won the Josephine Nefkens Prize for Cancer Research.

References

External links
 Profile at University Medical Center Utrecht

1950 births
Living people
Cancer researchers
Dutch biochemists
Members of the European Molecular Biology Organization
Members of the Royal Netherlands Academy of Arts and Sciences
People from Vlaardingen
Academic staff of Utrecht University
University of Amsterdam alumni
Vrije Universiteit Amsterdam alumni